Central Inland Fisheries Research Institute (CIFRI) is an autonomous research institute dedicated to inland fisheries management and augmentation under the Indian Council of Agricultural Research of Government of India. 

It was established on 17 March 1947 as the Central Inland Fisheries Research Station at Kolkata, under the Ministry of Food and Agriculture. In 1959 this research station was elevated to the status of "Central Inland Fisheries Research Institute, and moved to its own building at Barrackpore. In 1967 the institute came under the administrative control of the Indian Council of Agricultural Research (ICAR), New Delhi.

References

External links
http://www.cifri.res.in/

Research institutes in Kolkata
Multidisciplinary research institutes
Research institutes established in 1947
University of Calcutta
Maulana Abul Kalam Azad University of Technology
1947 establishments in West Bengal
Research institutes in West Bengal
Indian Council of Agricultural Research
1959 establishments in West Bengal